Spyglass Hill may refer to:
Spyglass Hill Golf Course in California
Spyglass Hill, Rothesay, a hill in New Brunswick, Canada